Engvald Bakkan (20 August 1897 – 3 July 1982) was a Norwegian pharmacist, novelist and children's writer.

Biography
Bakkan was born at Åmli in Aust-Agder.  He graduated  as a pharmacist in 1923. During his career, he lived and worked at Stavanger and Bryne; from 1955 at the Ørnen apotek in Stavanger.

He wrote 11 books: five novels; four short stories and two children's books. Among his best-known works is the novel trilogy from the 18th century, Krossen er din, Gjenom fossane and Regnbogen i toreskya, published between 1947 and 1952. He was awarded the Gyldendal's Endowment in 1953.

References

1897 births
1982 deaths
People from Åmli
Nynorsk-language writers
Norwegian children's writers
20th-century Norwegian novelists
Norwegian pharmacists